Josep Maria Mestres Quadreny (4 March 1929 – 18 January 2021) was a Spanish composer.

Biography
He studied sciences at the University of Barcelona, taking lessons in composition from Cristòfor Taltabull. In 1968 he started the Catalan Group of Contemporary Music (Conjunt Català de Música Contemporània), and in 1976 the Catalan Instrumental Group (Grup Instrumental Català) with Carles Santos. He also founded the Phonos Laboratory of Electroacoustic Music in 1973.

His output included incidental music for theatre and cinema, musicals, ballet, opera and instrumental music. He also collaborated with visual artists, including Joan Miró, Antoni Tàpies and Joan Brossa.

In addition to his compositional activities, he taught at the Darmstadt New Music Courses and the Latin American Course of Contemporary Music in Brazil.

He was chairman of the Joan Brossa Foundation and an emeritus member of the board of trustees of the Joan Miró Foundation.

Selected filmography
 Nocturne 29 (1968)

References

Marco, Tomás (1993): Spanish music in the twentieth century p 174, Harvard University Press

External links
 Information about Mestres Quadreny and the association of Catalan Composers, accessed 8 February 2010 (Spanish)
 Lamadeguido biography and works
 
 

1929 births
2021 deaths
20th-century classical composers
Composers from Catalonia
People from Manresa
Spanish classical composers
Spanish male classical composers
University of Barcelona alumni
20th-century Spanish musicians
20th-century Spanish male musicians